HSBC Bank (Panama) S.A. was a subsidiary of HSBC Holdings plc headquartered in Panama City, Panama. The bank provides Personal banking, Corporate banking and Treasury services to Panama. In 2013 Bancolombia Group acquired HSBC Panama and renamed it as Banistmo.

History
The HSBC Group operated in Panama since 1972, when The Hongkong and Shanghai Banking Corporation opened the representative office in Panama City that year. Approval to operate as a licensed banking institution in Panama City was granted in 1973 and in the Colón Free Trade Zone in 1993.

HSBC Bank (Panama) was incorporated on 1999, consistent with the HSBC Group's strategy of creating the global brand, HSBC. In 2000, HSBC acquired the banking operations of Chase Manhattan Bank in Panama. In 2005, HSBC acquired the group of companies trading under the brand name Financomer, which entered the personal lending market in Panama in 1986.

In November 2006, HSBC acquired Grupo Banistmo, the leading banking group in Central America and gave HSBC access to new markets, with offices in Colombia, Costa Rica, El Salvador, Honduras and Nicaragua. The merger of HSBC Bank (Panama) and Grupo Banistmo was successfully completed in 2007. But the subsidiary of Grupo Banistmo, Primer Banco del Istmo, was retained until it merged into HSBC Bank (Panama) in 2009.

Central America banking

Costa Rica
Banco HSBC (Costa Rica) S.A. operates around 40 branches throughout the major cities. HSBC entered Costa Rica in the summer of 2007; it was introduced under the promotional campaign "HSBC is the new name of BANEX". HSBC acquired Banex and has assumed operations in all of its branches. Banco Nacional de Costa Rica (BNCR) and BAC San Jose (Grupo BAC) is HSBC's largest competitor in the market.

Colombia
HSBC Colombia S.A. acquired as part of the purchase of Grupo Banistmo SA in 2006.

See also

Primer Banco del Istmo

External links
 HSBC Bank (Panama) website
HSBC Panama was sold to Bancolombia and operated under the name "Banistmo"
List of Banks in Panama

Banks of Panama
Panama
Companies based in Panama City